Pearson Education is a British-owned education publishing and assessment service to schools and corporations, as well for students directly.  Pearson owns educational media brands including Addison–Wesley, Peachpit, Prentice Hall, eCollege, Longman, Scott Foresman, and others. Pearson is part of Pearson plc, which formerly owned the Financial Times. It claims to have been formed in 1840, with the current incarnation of the company created when Pearson plc purchased the education division of Simon & Schuster (including Prentice Hall and Allyn & Bacon) from Viacom and merged it with its own education division, Addison-Wesley Longman, to form Pearson Education. Pearson Education was rebranded to Pearson in 2011 and split into an International and a North American division.

Although Pearson generates approximately 60 percent of its sales in North America, it operates in more than 70 countries. Pearson International is headquartered in London, and maintains offices across Europe, Asia and South America. Its online chat support is based in the Philippines. Pearson North America is headquartered at 330 Hudson in New York City, New York. It previously was located in Upper Saddle River, New Jersey. Pearson International is headquartered at 80 Strand, London, UK. Pearson Italia SpA, also known as Pearson Paravia Bruno Mondadori, was created through the purchase of PBM Editori, which was, in turn, a merge of Paravia (based in Turin) and Bruno Mondadori (based in Milan).

Imprints
Pearson has a number of publishing imprints:

Logo
Pearson's logo is the unconventional symbol known as the interrobang (‽), a combination of a question mark and an exclamation point, meant to convey "the excitement and fun of learning."

Partnerships
Pearson has partnered with five other higher-education publishers to create CourseSmart, a company developed to sell college textbooks in eTextbook format on a common platform. In 2010, Pearson agreed to a five-year, $32 million, contract with the New York State Department of Education to design tests for students attending grades 4 through 8.

GreyCampus partnered with Pearson for higher-education teaching-learning solutions under the Learningware brand.

Que Publishing, a publishing imprint of Pearson-based out of Seattle, partnered with AARP to develop and add to a series of technology books for seniors. The series, which includes My iPad For Seniors, and My Social Media for Seniors, are large-print and colourful.

Errors in tests

In the spring of 2012, tests that Pearson designed for the NYSED were found to contain over 30 errors, which caused controversy. One of the most prominent featured a passage about a talking pineapple on the 8th Grade ELA test (revealed to be based on Daniel Pinkwater's The Story of the Rabbit and the Eggplant, with the eggplant changed into a pineapple). After public outcry, the NYSED announced it would not count the questions in scoring. Other errors included a miscalculated question on the 8th Grade Mathematics test regarding astronomical units, a 4th grade math question with two correct answers, errors in the 6th grade ELA scoring guide, and over twenty errors on foreign-language math tests. In May 2015, British comedian John Oliver analysed problems with Pearson's standardized tests and the company's greater lack of accountability on his HBO series Last Week Tonight.

Technology products
Pearson's products include MyMathLab and Mastering Platform.

PowerSchool 
In 2006, Pearson acquired PowerSchool, a student information system, from Apple. Terms of the deal were not disclosed. PowerSchool was a profitable product for Pearson. In 2014, it generated $97 million in revenue and $20 million in operating income. In 2015, Pearson sold PowerSchool to Vista Equity Partners for $350 million cash.

Poptropica
In 2007, the company developed the youth-oriented online quest game Poptropica, through its Family Education Network. In 2015, Pearson's Family Education Network, along with Poptropica, were sold to the London-based investment group Sandbox Partners.

Cogmed
Pearson owns Cogmed, a brain fitness and working memory training program founded in 1999 by Swedish researcher Torkel Klingberg.

StatCrunch
In 2016, Pearson acquired StatCrunch, a statistical analysis tool created by Webster West in 1997. Pearson had already been the primary distributor of StatCrunch for several years.

InformIT 

InformIT, a subsidiary of Pearson Education, is an online book vendor and an electronic publisher of technology and education content.

InformIT.com is one of the websites of the Pearson Technology Group, and one of several sites in the InformIT Network. The site features free articles, blogs, and podcasts on IT topics and products, as well as a bookstore carrying all titles from these imprints. Publishing imprints represented on InformIT.com include Addison-Wesley Professional, Cisco Press, IBM Press, Prentice Hall Professional Technical Reference, Que Publishing, and Sams Publishing.

The other sites in the InformIT Network include:
 Peachpit.com: Peachpit is a publisher that has been publishing books on graphic design, desktop publishing, multimedia, Web design and development, digital video, and general computing since 1986. Peachpit is a publishing partner for Adobe Press, lynda.com, NAPP, Apple Certified, AIGA Design Press and others.
 FTPress.com: The book publishing imprint related to the Financial Times newspaper, FT Press creates books in the areas of general business, finance and investing, sales and marketing, leadership, management and strategy, human resources, and global business. FT Press is the publishing partner for Wharton School Publishing.

Safari Books Online joint venture

In 2001, the Pearson Technology Group and O'Reilly Media LLC formed a joint partnership called Safari Books Online, to offer a web-based electronic library of technical and business books from InformIT's imprint partners and O'Reilly Media. The InformIT Network offers access to this service via its web sites. Pearson sold its interest in Safari Books Online to O'Reilly in 2014.

Realidades 
Realidades is a standards-based high school curriculum that balances communications and grammar. With books for both middle school and high school students, Realidades features insight on the Spanish language, culture and technology.

Digital textbooks 
In July 2019, Pearson announced it would begin the process of phasing out the publishing of printed textbooks, in a plan to move into a more digital first strategy.

The company reportedly envisions students relying more on e-textbooks which would be updated frequently, while printed books will be updated less often. Students wanting printed books will need to rent them.

Current business model
As of 2019, the firm gets half of their annual revenues from digital sales. The United States accounts for 20 percent of Pearson's annual revenue coming from courseware.

See also
 
 List of largest UK book publishers
 Houghton Mifflin Harcourt
 McGraw-Hill Education

References 

Educational publishing companies
Educational publishing companies of the United Kingdom
Publishing companies of the United Kingdom
Book publishing companies based in London
Computer book publishing companies
Educational book publishing companies
Textbook publishing companies
Education companies established in 1998
British companies established in 1998
Publishing companies established in 1998
1998 establishments in England